"Something Right" is a song by Irish boy band Westlife from their eighth studio album Back Home. The song was released as the band's second single in Asia and Europe following their first single, "Home", as well as the album's overall third single. The song was composed by Rami Yacoub, Savan Kotecha and Arnthor Birgisson. A music video was filmed in December 2007 in London and premiered on March 7, 2008. This single was not released as a single in UK and Ireland.

Tours performed at
Back Home Tour (2008)

Background
The band's record label, Sony BMG, aimed to increase album promotions and sales through the release of this single, which happens to be a fan favourite. The song was composed by Rami Yacoub, Savan Kotecha and Arnthor Birgisson, who also contributed the songs "Us Against the World", "The Easy Way", and "Pictures In My Head" to the Back Home album.

Track listing
 Digital single
 "Something Right" (Single Mix)
 "Get Away"

 Digital EP
 "Something Right" (Single Mix)
 "Something Right" (Instrumental)
 "Hard to Say I'm Sorry"
 "Something Right" (Video)

Music video
The music video for "Something Right" began shoot on 17 December 2007, directed by Amber and Brown and was shot in London. It premiered on March 7, 2008 on music channels. The video uses a brand new remix track of the song and was shot using green screen, featuring the band in a desert and subsequently in a futuristic night setting.

Chart performance

References

2007 songs
2008 singles
Westlife songs
Songs written by Rami Yacoub
Songs written by Savan Kotecha
Songs written by Arnthor Birgisson
Song recordings produced by Rami Yacoub
Sony BMG singles
Soul ballads
2000s ballads
Sony Music singles
RCA Records singles